This is a list of 329 Important Intangible Folk Cultural Properties of Japan.

Criteria
 It must exemplify something original in the Japanese people's everyday life in terms of origin and content, and be typical.
 It must exemplify the process of evolution of some technique.
 It must exemplify some local characteristic.

Designated cultural properties

Manners and customs

Manufacture, livelihood
9 designations. All were designated under Criteria 1.

Life rituals
6 designations. All were designated under Criteria 1.

Amusements, contests
10 designations, all under criterion 1.

Social life (knowledge of folk customs)
2 designations, all under criterion 1

Annual functions or events
34 designations, all under criterion 1

Religious festivals and beliefs
70 designations. All were designated under Criteria 1. This includes all but one of the 33 festivals in the UNESCO Intangible cultural heritage Yama, Hoko, Yatai, float festivals in Japan.

Folk performing arts

are dances associated with Shinto shrines.

There have been 40 designations, all under Criteria 1, unless otherwise indicated.

are musical presentations/dances related to rice planting.

There have been 25 designations, all under Criteria 1 unless otherwise indicated.

are traditional folk dances often consisting of large processions of participants typically wearing colorful costumes and accompanied by props. In these dances, dancing is accompanied by Buddhist chanting and hymns.

There have been 43 designations, all designated under Criteria 1 unless otherwise indicated.

Storytelling
6 designations. All were designated under Criteria 1 except for the Hakata Matsubayashi which was designated under 2 and 3.

Ennen and Okonai

 (lit. "extend the years") are Buddhist temple entertainments performed at the end of Buddhist services and believed to extend the listeners' lifespans. (lit. "deeds") are Buddhist New Year celebrations in which the evils of the past year are driven away.

There have been 7 designations, all under Criteria 1.

Entertainment from abroad and performance arts
40 designations. All were designated under criteria 1 unless otherwise indicated.

Other
18 designations. All were designated under Criteria 1 except for the Daiko of the Kokura Gion Festival and the Inaba and Tajima Kirin Lion dance which were designated under criteria 2 and 3.

Folk techniques

Manufacturing and production
16 designations.

Necessities of life
3 designations, all under criteria 3.

See also
 Intangible Cultural Heritage of the Philippines

Notes

References

Bibliography

External links
 Inventory-making for Intangible Cultural Heritage Management

 

Japanese folk art
Folk
Intangible Folk
Articles containing video clips
Intangible Cultural Properties